Phi Theta Kappa Honor Society ( or PTK) is the international honor society of students attending open-access institutions and seeking associate degrees, bachelor's degrees, or other college credentials. Its headquarters is in Jackson, Mississippi, and has more than 3.5 million members in nearly 1,300 chapters in 10 nations.

Mission 
The mission of Phi Theta Kappa is to recognize high academic achievement of college students and to provide opportunities for them to grow as scholars and leaders.

History, name, origin, and usage 
The origin of Phi Theta Kappa can be traced back to Kappa Phi Omicron, an honor society established in 1910 at Stephens College in Missouri, a two-year college for women. As similar honor societies sprang up in the state, the college presidents and students of eight Missouri women's colleges came together in 1918 to create a single honor society with a unified mission — Phi Theta Kappa was born.

Phi Theta Kappa is named after Phi Beta Kappa, the international honor society for four-year colleges and universities, and it was modeled after many aspects of the prestigious senior college honor society.

"PTK" is acceptable on second reference, and members may be referred to as "Phi Theta Kappans."

The first chapter was chartered at a coeducational school, St. Joseph Junior College in Missouri, in 1926. The first chapter chartered outside Missouri was at Northeast Junior College in Oklahoma.

On November 19, 1929, the American Association of Junior Colleges (now the American Association of Community Colleges) recognized Phi Theta Kappa as the official national honor society for junior colleges. It is the only honor society to have received that distinction. Phi Theta Kappa celebrates its Founders Day on November 19 each year.

Symbols 

The first membership pin was designed in 1921: a blue triangle containing the three Greek letters surrounded by pearls. The distinctive gold key membership pin was adopted in 1930 and features a black enamel band upon which the three Greek letters appear. Behind the band is a wreath composed of oak leaves on one side, denoting stability and strength of character, and laurel on the other side, signifying achievement and success. Above the band is a representation of the head of Athena, Goddess of Learning; in the base appear the mystic Greek letters meaning light, the light of learning, and knowledge.

The colors of the society are blue, for scholarship, and gold, for purity.

Membership 
Membership in Phi Theta Kappa is by invitation only and is highly selective. Students must complete 12 hours of coursework toward an associate degree, 6 hours toward a one-year certificate, or 12 hours toward a bachelor's degree and have a minimum 3.7 grade point average (GPA). Merely meeting basic requirements will not guarantee an invitation. Local chapters may raise these eligibility standards.

Members are required to pay a one-time membership fee, which includes a $60 international fee. Regional and local chapter fees may be added to the international fee. There are no annual dues, and the membership is a lifetime membership.

Benefits of membership 
Phi Theta Kappa partners with more than 800 four-year colleges and universities to offer more than $46 million in transfer scholarships exclusively to its members. PTK also partners with organizations and foundations to offer scholarships to help students complete associate, bachelor's, and master's degrees and to help workforce-bound students pay certification costs. Students also have several opportunities to have their work published in nationally distributed publications, such as PTK's Literary Journal Nota Bene, Civic Scholar: Phi Theta Kappa Journal of Undergraduate Research, and Change Makers: Phi Theta Kappa Journal of Student Leadership.

Members can seek leadership positions in their local chapters, their regions, or on the international level, which bolsters their resume and provides leadership experience, community service opportunities and professional development. PTK offers a free online program to help students develop job skills. Letters of recommendation are also available, as are discounts to national businesses, including GEICO, Enterprise, Lenovo, Dell, Hurst Review Services, Bank of America and Bartleby.

Notable members 
 Carol M. Browner, former United States Environmental Protection Agency administrator – Miami-Dade College
 Franklin Castellanos, recipient of the Culero Scholarship – Columbia Basin College
 Dr. Sylvia Earle, oceanographer and explorer – St. Petersburg College
 Evan Edinger, American-born YouTuber based in London, England – Salem Community College
 Clint Ford, actor and voice artist – Tarrant County College 
 Alberto Gutman, former Florida Republican politician
 Fred Haise, Apollo 13 astronaut – Mississippi Gulf Coast Community College
 Clarence Harmon, former mayor of St. Louis – St. Louis Community College
 Garrett Johnson, shot putter and Rhodes Scholar
 Rich Karlgaard, Forbes magazine publisher – Bismarck State College
 Dr. Jeane Kirkpatrick, former United Nations ambassador – Stephens College
 Jim Lehrer, journalist and PBS news anchor – Victoria College
 Carolyne Mas, singer-songwriter and performer – Cochise College
 Wes Moore, current Governor of Maryland, author – Valley Forge Military Academy and College
 Francine Irving Neff, former Treasurer of the United States – Cottey College
 Mirta Ojito, Pulitzer Prize-winning journalist – Miami-Dade Community College
 H. Ross Perot, billionaire businessman and former presidential candidate – Texarkana College
 James F. Ports Jr., former Maryland House of Delegates member – Essex Community College
 Dr. Dan Stoenescu, Romanian diplomat, political scientist and journalist – College of Alameda 
 Sela Ward, actress –  Meridian Community College
 Michael Weiss, Olympic ice skater and American national champion – Prince George's Community College
 Steven Whitehurst, award-winning author – South Suburban College
 Trisha Yearwood, country musician and cookbook author – Young Harris College

References

External links
Phi Theta Kappa International Honor Society
CCSmart: Phi Theta Kappa's Community College Resource, Advocacy and Directory Website
American Association of Community Colleges

Two-year college honor societies
Student societies in the United States
Student organizations established in 1918
1918 establishments in Missouri
Honor societies